John Stratford (died about 1501), was a medieval Mayor of Winchester.

John was born into a cadet branch of the aristocratic House of Stratford, a descendant of John Stratford and Andrew de Stratford, and relative of the de Inkepenne family. He lived in St Mary Kalendar parish, was mayor of Winchester in the years 1482-1483, 1490-1491, and 1499-1500. By 1478 his extensive Winchester estate had incorporated a number of surrounding tenements and gardens, as well as the ruins of Saint Martin church.

Notes

John
1501 deaths